The 1899–1900 season was Stoke's 11th season in the Football League.

As the nineteenth century gave way to the twentieth, it became common knowledge that Stoke were still under a heavy financial cloud. There had been more public appeals for funds - and a certain amount of money had been raised. The directors had continued to go to Scotland for players but, they were not all that successful. The team itself had flirted with relegation for a number of seasons now and there had been only one respectable cup run, Stoke often looked capable of beating the best teams in the country but they were far too inconsistent and always seemed to be at least a couple of quality players short of what was required to challenge for honours.

Stoke's final season of the nineteenth century saw them finish in a mid table position of 9th, Stoke struggled for goals during the season scoring 37 only the bottom two relegated clubs scoring less.

Season review

League
Stoke began the 1899–1900 campaign well, beating Liverpool and Preston North End at home and drawing away at Burnley in their first three matches. Tom Wilkes had replaced the outgoing George Clawley in goal and there was a change in attack as local player Sam Higginson was introduced in the place of Fred Molyneux who joined Bristol City while Jack Farrell joined Southampton. Tom Holford also came through the ranks at the Victoria Ground and he went on to become a club legend making over 260 appearances.  There was also change in the boardroom as Mr W Cowlishaw replaced Mr J Fenton.

On 13 November 1899 league leaders Aston Villa visited Stoke which attracted a crowd of 15,000 to the Victoria Ground. Gate receipts amounted to £379 a record at the time. Villa won 2–0 and were on their way to a third straight title. Stoke took ninth place in the First Division just two points away from fifth.

FA Cup
After last seasons run to the semi-final Stoke exited the FA Cup this season in the first round losing 1–0 in a replay to Liverpool after a 0–0 draw.

Final league table

Results

Stoke's score comes first

Legend

Football League First Division

FA Cup

Squad statistics

References

Stoke City F.C. seasons
Stoke